The Cistercian Abbey of Woney (Irish,  Mainistir Uaithne), also written Wotheny or Owney, on the banks of the Mulkear River in Abington, County Limerick, was founded in 1205 when Theobald Walter (le Botiller) granted the whole "theodum" (believed to be an error, which should have been feodum) of Woodenikuwice for the purpose. Traces of the architecture and layout of the monastery may still seen in the graveyard in the hamlet of Abington, just south of Murroe.

In the early fourteenth century the possessions of the abbey included 
the lands of Athnid parish in County Tipperary.

Around 1563, the abbey and all its possessions were  granted by Elizabeth I to a Captain Walshe who erected a new house near the old buildings. In 1609, part of the lands which formerly belonged to the abbey were conveyed by Sir E. Walsh to Sir Richard Boyle. In the war of 1641 the estates granted to the Walshe family were forfeited to the Crown.

Burials
Theobald Walter, 1st Chief Butler of Ireland

References

Cistercian monasteries in the Republic of Ireland